Osted is a town with a population of 2,204 (1 January 2022) in Lejre Municipality, Region Zealand, Denmark. The town is located at the road between the cities of Roskilde and Ringsted.

Notable people 
 Hans Denver (born 1876 in Osted – 1961) a Danish sports shooter who competed in the 1912 Summer Olympics
 Niels-Henning Ørsted Pedersen (born 1946 in Osted - 2005) a Danish jazz double bassist 
 Peter Aalbæk Jensen (born 1956 in Osted) a Danish film producer

References

Cities and towns in Region Zealand
Lejre Municipality